The 8th constituency of Val-d'Oise is a French legislative constituency in the Val-d'Oise département.  It is currently represented by Carlos Martens Bilongo of LFI.

Description

The 8th constituency of Val-d'Oise contains the town of Garges-lès-Gonesse and the north eastern half of Sarcelles.

The seat is notable for being held by former Finance Minister, head of the International Monetary Fund and candidate for the PS presidential nomination Dominique Strauss-Kahn.

Historic Representation

Election results

2022

 
 
 
 
 
 
 
 
 
|-
| colspan="8" bgcolor="#E9E9E9"|
|-

2017

2012

 
 
 
 
 
 
 
|-
| colspan="8" bgcolor="#E9E9E9"|
|-

2007

 
 
 
 
 
 
 
 
|-
| colspan="8" bgcolor="#E9E9E9"|
|-

2002

 
 
 
 
 
 
 
|-
| colspan="8" bgcolor="#E9E9E9"|
|-

1997

 
 
 
 
 
 
|-
| colspan="8" bgcolor="#E9E9E9"|
|-

Sources
Official results of French elections from 2002: "Résultats électoraux officiels en France" (in French).

8